This is a list of writing systems (or scripts), classified according to some common distinguishing features.

The usual name of the script is given first; the name of the language(s) in which the script is written follows (in brackets), particularly in the case where the language name differs from the script name. Other informative or qualifying annotations for the script may also be provided.

Pictographic/ideographic writing systems
Ideographic scripts (in which graphemes are ideograms representing concepts or ideas, rather than a specific word in a language), and pictographic scripts (in which the graphemes are iconic pictures) are not thought to be able to express all that can be communicated by language, as argued by the linguists John DeFrancis and J. Marshall Unger.  Essentially, they postulate that no full writing system can be completely pictographic or ideographic; it must be able to refer directly to a language in order to have the full expressive capacity of a language.  Unger disputes claims made on behalf of Blissymbols in his 2004 book Ideogram.

Although a few pictographic or ideographic scripts exist today, there is no single way to read them, because there is no one-to-one correspondence between symbol and language.  Hieroglyphs were commonly thought to be ideographic before they were translated, and to this day Chinese is often erroneously said to be ideographic. In some cases of ideographic scripts, only the author of a text can read it with any certainty, and it may be said that they are interpreted rather than read.  Such scripts often work best as mnemonic aids for oral texts, or as outlines that will be fleshed out in speech.
Adinkra
Birch-bark glyphsAnishinaabemowin
Dongba Naxi Although this is often supplemented with syllabic Geba script.
Emoji – used in electronic messages and web pages.
Ersu Shābā – Ersu
Kaidā glyphs
Lusona
Nsibidi Ekoi, Efik/Ibibio, Igbo
Siglas poveiras
Suckerfish script Mi'kmawi'sit Does have phonetic components, however.
Testerian – used for missionary work in Mexico.

There are also symbol systems used to represent things other than language, or to represent constructed languages. Some of these are:

Blissymbols – A constructed ideographic script used primarily in Augmentative and Alternative Communication (AAC).
iConji – A constructed ideographic script used primarily in social networking
Isotype (picture language)
A wide variety of notations

Linear B also incorporates ideograms.

Logographic writing systems
In logographic writing systems, glyphs represent words or morphemes (meaningful components of words, as in mean-ing-ful), rather than phonetic elements.

Note that no logographic script is composed solely of logograms. All contain graphemes that represent phonetic (sound-based) elements as well. These phonetic elements may be used on their own (to represent, for example, grammatical inflections or foreign words), or may serve as phonetic complements to a logogram (used to specify the sound of a logogram that might otherwise represent more than one word). In the case of Chinese, the phonetic element is built into the logogram itself; in Egyptian and Mayan, many glyphs are purely phonetic, whereas others function as either logograms or phonetic elements, depending on context. For this reason, many such scripts may be more properly referred to as logosyllabic or complex scripts; the terminology used is largely a product of custom in the field, and is to an extent arbitrary.

Consonant-based logographies
Hieroglyphic, Hieratic, and Demotic – the writing systems of Ancient Egypt
Egyptian hieroglyphs
List of Egyptian hieroglyphs by common name

Syllable-based logographies
Anatolian hieroglyphs – Luwian
Cuneiform – Sumerian, Akkadian, other Semitic languages, Elamite, Hittite, Luwian, Hurrian, and Urartian
Chinese characters (Hanzi) – Chinese, Japanese (called Kanji), Korean (called Hanja), Vietnamese (called Chu Nom, obsolete)
Sawndip – Zhuang
Khitan large script – Khitan
Khitan small script – Khitan
Jurchen script – Jurchen
Tangut script – Tangut 
Eghap (or Bagam) script
Mayan – Chorti, Yucatec, and other Classic Maya languages
Sui script – Sui language
Yi (classical) – various Yi/Lolo languages

Syllabaries
In a syllabary, graphemes represent syllables or moras. (Note that the 19th-century term syllabics usually referred to abugidas rather than true syllabaries.)

Afaka Ndyuka
Alaska or Yugtun script Central Yup'ik
Bété
Cherokee Cherokee
Cypriot Arcadocypriot Greek
Geba Naxi
Iban or Dunging script Iban
Kana Japanese (although primarily based on moras rather than syllables)
Hiragana
Katakana
Man'yōgana
Kikakui – Mende
Kpelle Kpelle
Linear B Mycenean Greek
Lisu Bamboo script 
Loma Loma
Masaba – Bambara
Nüshu Chinese
Nwagu Aneke script Igbo
Vai Vai
Woleaian Woleaian (a likely syllabary)
Yi (modern) various Yi/Lolo languages

Semi-syllabaries: Partly syllabic, partly alphabetic scripts
In most of these systems, some consonant-vowel combinations are written as syllables, but others are written as consonant plus vowel. In the case of Old Persian, all vowels were written regardless, so it was effectively a true alphabet despite its syllabic component. In Japanese a similar system plays a minor role in foreign borrowings; for example, [tu] is written [to]+[u], and [ti] as [te]+[i]. Paleohispanic semi-syllabaries behaved as a syllabary for the stop consonants and as an alphabet for the rest of consonants and vowels.

The Tartessian or Southwestern script is typologically intermediate between a pure alphabet and the Paleohispanic full semi-syllabaries. Although the letter used to write a stop consonant was determined by the following vowel, as in a full semi-syllabary, the following vowel was also written, as in an alphabet. Some scholars treat Tartessian as a redundant semi-syllabary, others treat it as a redundant alphabet. Zhuyin is semi-syllabic in a different sense: it transcribes half syllables. That is, it has letters for syllable onsets and rimes (kan = "k-an") rather than for consonants and vowels (kan = "k-a-n").

Bamum scriptBamum (a defective syllabary, with alphabetic principles used to fill the gaps)
Bopomofo or Zhuyin fuhao phonetic script for the different varieties of Chinese.
Eskayan Bohol, Philippines (a syllabary apparently based on an alphabet; some alphabetic characteristics remain)
Khom script Bahnaric languages, including Alak and Jru'.  (Onset-rime script)
Linear Elamite Elamite language
Paleohispanic semi-syllabaries Paleo-Hispanic languages
Celtiberian script Celtiberian language
Northeastern Iberian script Iberian language
Southeastern Iberian script Iberian language
Tartessian or Southwestern script Tartessian or Southwestern language
Old Persian cuneiform Old Persian
Quốc Âm Tân Tự Vietnamese (Onset-rime script)

Segmental scripts

A segmental script has graphemes which represent the phonemes (basic unit of sound) of a language.

Note that there need not be (and rarely is) a one-to-one correspondence between the graphemes of the script and the phonemes of a language. A phoneme may be represented only by some combination or string of graphemes, the same phoneme may be represented by more than one distinct grapheme, the same grapheme may stand for more than one phoneme, or some combination of all of the above.

Segmental scripts may be further divided according to the types of phonemes they typically record:

Abjads
An abjad is a segmental script containing symbols for consonants only, or where vowels are optionally written with diacritics ("pointing") or only written word-initially.

Ancient North Arabian Dadanitic, Dumaitic, Hasaitic, Hismaic, Safaitic, Taymanitic, and Thamudic
Ancient South Arabian Old South Arabian languages including Himyaritic, Hadhramautic, Minaean, Sabaean and Qatabanic; also the Ethiopic language Geʽez. 
Aramaic, including Khwarezmian ( Chorasmian), Elymaic, Palmyrene, and Hatran
Arabic Arabic, Azeri, Chittagonian (historically), Punjabi, Baluchi, Kashmiri, Pashto, Persian, Kurdish (vowels obligatory), Sindhi, Uighur (vowels obligatory), Urdu, Malay (as Jawi) and many other languages spoken in Africa and Western, Central, and Southeast Asia,
Hebrew Hebrew and other Jewish languages
Manichaean script
Nabataean the Nabataeans of Petra
Pahlavi script Middle Persian
Parthian
Psalter
Phoenician Phoenician and other Canaanite languages
Proto-Canaanite
Sogdian
Samaritan (Old Hebrew) Aramaic, Arabic, and Hebrew
Syriac Assyrian Neo-Aramaic, Chaldean Neo-Aramaic, Syriac, Turoyo and other Neo-Aramaic languages
Tifinagh Tuareg
Ugaritic Ugaritic, Hurrian

True alphabets
A true alphabet contains separate letters (not diacritic marks) for both consonants and vowels.

Linear nonfeatural alphabets

Linear alphabets are composed of lines on a surface, such as ink on paper.

Adlam Fula
Armenian Armenian
Avestan Avestan
Avoiuli Raga
Borama Somali
CarianCarian
Caucasian Albanian Caucasian Albanian
Coorgi–Cox alphabet Kodava
Coptic Egyptian
Cyrillic Eastern South Slavic languages (Bulgarian and Macedonian), the Western South Slavic Serbian,  Eastern Slavic languages (Belarusian, Russian, Ukrainian), the other languages of Russia, Kazakh language, Kyrgyz language, Tajik language, Mongolian language. Azerbaijan, Turkmenistan, and Uzbekistan are changing to the Latin alphabet but still have considerable use of Cyrillic. See Languages using Cyrillic.
Deseret alphabet – proposed for English but never adopted
Eclectic shorthand English
Elbasan Albanian
Fraser Lisu
Gabelsberger shorthand German
Garay Wolof and Mandinka
Georgian Georgian and other Kartvelian languages
Gjirokastër (also called Veso Bey) Albanian
Glagolitic Old Church Slavonic
Gothic Gothic
Greek Greek, historically a variety of other languages
Hanifi Rohingya
International Phonetic Alphabet
Kaddare Somali
Latin  Roman originally Latin language; most current western and central European languages, Turkic languages, sub-Saharan African languages, indigenous languages of the Americas, languages of maritime Southeast Asia and languages of Oceania use developments of it. Languages using a non-Latin writing system are generally also equipped with Romanization for transliteration or secondary use.
Lycian Lycian
Lydian Lydian
Manchu Manchu
Mandaic Mandaic dialect of Aramaic
Medefaidrin also called Obɛri Ɔkaimɛ; used for the religious language of the same name
Mongolian Mongolian
Mundari Bani Mundari
Mru Mru
Neo-Tifinagh Tamazight
Nyiakeng Puachue Hmong Hmong
N'Ko Maninka language, Bambara, Dyula language
Ogham Gaelic, Britannic, Pictish
Ol Chiki  Ol Cemet' or Ol Chemet' Santali
Old Hungarian (in Hungarian magyar rovásírás or székely-magyar rovásírás) Hungarian
Old Italic a family of connected alphabets for the Etruscan, Oscan, Umbrian, Messapian, South Picene, Raetic, Venetic, Lepontic, Camunic languages
Old Permic (also called Abur) Komi
Old Turkic Old Turkic
Old Uyghur Old Uyghur
Ol Onal Bhumij Language
Osmanya Somali
Pau Cin Hau script Zomi and other Northern Kuki-Chin languages
Runes Germanic languages
Sayaboury (also called Eebee Hmong or Ntawv Puaj Txwm) Hmong Daw
Sorang Sompeng Sora
Tai Lue Lue
Tangsa Tangsa language
Todhri Albanian
Tolong Siki Kurukh
Toto Toto 
Unifon – proposed for English, never adopted
Vah Bassa 
Vellara Albanian
Vithkuqi  Beitha Kukju Albanian
Wancho Wancho
Yezidi Kurmanji
Zaghawa Zaghawa
Zoulai Zou (also has alphasyllabic characteristics)

Featural linear alphabets
A featural script has elements that indicate the components of articulation, such as bilabial consonants, fricatives, or back vowels. Scripts differ in how many features they indicate.

ASL-phabet
Ditema tsa Dinoko  IsiBheqe SoHlamvu for Southern Bantu languages
Duployan Shorthand
Gregg Shorthand
Hangul Korean
Osage Osage
Shavian alphabet – proposed for English, never adopted
SignWriting and its descendants si5s and ASLwrite for sign languages
Stokoe notation for American Sign Language, and its descendant, the Hamburg Notation System or HamNoSys
Tengwar (a fictional script)
Visible Speech (a phonetic script)

Linear alphabets arranged into syllabic blocks
HangulKorean
Great Lakes Algonquian syllabicsFox, Potawatomi, Ho-Chunk, Ojibwe
IsiBheqe SoHlamvuSouthern Bantu languages
ʼPhags-pa scriptMongolian, Chinese, Persian, Sanskrit

Manual alphabets
Manual alphabets are frequently found as parts of sign languages. They are not used for writing per se, but for spelling out words while signing.
American manual alphabet (used with slight modification in Hong Kong, Malaysia, Paraguay, Philippines, Singapore, Taiwan, Thailand)
British manual alphabet (used in some of the Commonwealth of Nations, such as Australia and New Zealand)
Catalan manual alphabet
Chilean manual alphabet
Chinese manual alphabet
Dutch manual alphabet
Ethiopian manual alphabet (an abugida)
French manual alphabet
Greek manual alphabet
Icelandic manual alphabet (also used in Denmark)
Indian manual alphabet (a true alphabet?; used in Devanagari and Gujarati areas)
International manual alphabet (used in Germany, Austria, Norway, Finland)
Iranian manual alphabet (an abjad; also used in Egypt)
Israeli manual alphabet (an abjad)
Italian manual alphabet
Korean manual alphabet
Latin American manual alphabets
Polish manual alphabet
Portuguese manual alphabet
Romanian manual alphabet
Russian manual alphabet (also used in Bulgaria and ex-Soviet states)
Spanish manual alphabet (Madrid)
Swedish manual alphabet
Yugoslav manual alphabet

Other non-linear alphabets
These are other alphabets composed of something other than lines on a surface.

Braille (Unified) an embossed alphabet for the visually impaired, used with some extra letters to transcribe the Latin, Cyrillic, Greek, Hebrew, and Arabic alphabets, as well as Chinese
Braille (Korean)
Braille (American) (defunct)
New York Point a defunct alternative to Braille
International maritime signal flags (both alphabetic and ideographic)
Morse code (International) a trinary code of dashes, dots, and silence, whether transmitted by electricity, light, or sound) representing characters in the Latin alphabet.
American Morse code (defunct)
Optical telegraphy (defunct)
Flag semaphore (made by moving hand-held flags)

Abugidas
An abugida, or alphasyllabary, is a segmental script in which vowel sounds are denoted by diacritical marks or other systematic modification of the consonants. Generally, however, if a single letter is understood to have an inherent unwritten vowel, and only vowels other than this are written, then the system is classified as an abugida regardless of whether the vowels look like diacritics or full letters. The vast majority of abugidas are found from India to Southeast Asia and belong historically to the Brāhmī family, however the term is derived from the first characters of the abugida in Ge'ez: አ (A) ቡ (bu) ጊ (gi) ዳ (da) — (compare with alphabet). Unlike abjads, the diacritical marks and systemic modifications of the consonants are not optional.

Abugidas of the Brāhmī family

Ahom
Balinese
Batak Toba and other Batak languages
Baybayin Formerly used for Ilokano, Pangasinan, Tagalog, Bikol languages, Visayan languages, and possibly other Philippine languages
Bengali and Assamese- Bengali, Assamese, Meithei, Bishnupriya Manipuri
Bhaiksuki 
Brahmi Sanskrit, Prakrit
Buda Old Sundanese and Old Javanese
Buhid
Burmese Burmese, Karen languages, Mon, and Shan
Cham
Chakma 
Devanagari Hindi, Sanskrit, Marathi, Nepali, and many other languages of northern India
Dhives Akuru
Grantha Sanskrit
Gujarati Gujarati, Kutchi, Vasavi, Sanskrit, Avestan
Gurmukhi script Punjabi
Hanuno’o
Javanese
Kaithi
Kannada Kannada, Tulu, Konkani, Kodava
Kawi
Khema script Gurung
Khojki 
Khotanese
Khudabadi 
Khmer
Kulitan alphabet
Lai Tay Tai Yo
Lampung
Lao
Leke Eastern Pwo, Western Pwo, and Karen
Lepcha
Limbu
Lontara’ Buginese, Makassar, and Mandar
Mahajani
Makasar Formerly used for Makassar
Malayalam
Marchen – Zhang-Zhung 
Meetei Mayek
Modi Marathi
Multani – Saraiki 
Nandinagari – Sanskrit
New Tai Lue
Odia
Phags-pa Mongolian, Chinese, and other languages of the Yuan dynasty Mongol Empire
Pracalit script  Newa Nepal Bhasa, Sanskrit, Pali
Pyu Pyu
Ranjana Nepal Bhasa, Sanskrit
Rejang
Rencong
Saurashtra
Sharada Sanskrit, Kashmiri
Siddham Sanskrit
Sinhala
Sirmauri
Soyombo
Sundanese
Sylheti Nagri – Bengali, Dobhashi, Sylheti
Tagbanwa Languages of Palawan
Tai Le  Dehong Dai Tai Nuea 
Tai Tham Khün, and Northern Thai
Tai Viet
Takri 
Tamil
Telugu
Thai
Tibetan
Tigalari Sanskrit, Tulu
Tirhuta used to write Maithili
Tocharian
Vatteluttu
Zanabazar Square 
Zhang zhung scripts

Other abugidas
Canadian Aboriginal syllabics Cree syllabics (for Cree), Inuktitut syllabics (for Inuktitut), Ojibwe syllabics (for Ojibwe), and various systems for other languages of Canada.  Derived scripts with identical operating principles but divergent character repertoires include Carrier and Blackfoot syllabics.
Dham Dhimal
Ge'ez Amharic, Ge’ez, Tigrigna
Kharoṣṭhī Gandhari, Sanskrit
Lontara Bilang-bilang script Buginese
Mandombe
Meroitic Meroë
Mwangwego Chewa and other Bantu languages of Malawi
Pitman Shorthand
Pollard script Miao
Sapalo script Oromo
Rma script Qiang
Sunuwar  Jenticha
Thaana Dhivehi
Tikamuli Sunuwar
Thomas Natural Shorthand

Final consonant-diacritic abugidas
In at least one abugida, not only the vowel but any syllable-final consonant is written with a diacritic.

Róng Lepcha

Vowel-based abugidas
In a few abugidas, the vowels are basic, and the consonants secondary. If no consonant is written in Pahawh Hmong, it is understood to be /k/; consonants are written after the vowel they precede in speech. In Japanese Braille, the vowels but not the consonants have independent status, and it is the vowels which are modified when the consonant is y or w.

Boyd's Syllabic Shorthand
Japanese Braille Japanese
Pahawh Hmong Hmong

List of writing systems by adoption

Undeciphered scripts and systems that may be writing

These systems have not been deciphered. In some cases, such as Meroitic, the sound values of the glyphs are known, but the texts still cannot be read because the language is not understood. Several of these systems, such as Epi-Olmec and Indus, are claimed to have been deciphered, but these claims have not been confirmed by independent researchers. In many cases it is doubtful that they are actually writing. The Vinča symbols appear to be proto-writing, and quipu may have recorded only numerical information. There are doubts that Indus is writing, and the Phaistos Disc has so little content or context that its nature is undetermined.

Byblos syllabary the city of Byblos
Cretan hieroglyphs
Indus Indus Valley civilization
Isthmian (apparently logosyllabic)
Linear A (a syllabary) Minoan
Lukasa Kingdom of Luba (a memory device)
Mixtec Mixtec (perhaps pictographic)
Neolithic signs in China, including:
Banpo symbols Yangshao culture (perhaps proto-writing)
Jiahu symbols Peiligang culture (perhaps proto-writing)
Sawveh Western Guangxi (disputed; perhaps proto-writing)
Olmec Olmec civilization (possibly the oldest Mesoamerican script)
Para-Lydian script Unknown language of Asia Minor; script appears related to the Lydian alphabet.
Phaistos Disc (a unique text, very possibly not writing)
Proto-Elamite Elam (nearly as old as Sumerian)
Proto-Sinaitic (likely an abjad)
Quipu Inca Empire (possibly numerical only)
Rongorongo Rapa Nui (perhaps a syllabary)
Sidetic Sidetic 
Trojan script (possibly related to Linear B)
Zapotec Zapotec (another old Mesoamerican script)

Undeciphered manuscripts
Comparatively recent manuscripts and other texts written in undeciphered (and often unidentified) writing systems; some of these may represent ciphers of known languages or hoaxes.

Voynich manuscript
Rohonc Codex
Codex Seraphinianus
Hamptonese
Dorabella cipher

Other
Asemic writing is a writing-like form of artistic expression that generally lacks a specific semantic meaning, though it sometimes contains ideograms or pictograms.

Phonetic alphabets
This section lists alphabets used to transcribe phonetic or phonemic sound; not to be confused with spelling alphabets like the ICAO spelling alphabet. Some of these are used for transcription purposes by linguists; others are pedagogical in nature or intended as general orthographic reforms.

 International Phonetic Alphabet
 X-SAMPA (and original SAMPA while not covering all of IPA), is an encoding of a phonetic alphabet, i.e. IPA, using just ASCII.
 Americanist phonetic notation
 Uralic Phonetic Alphabet

Special alphabets
Alphabets may exist in forms other than visible symbols on a surface. Some of these are:

Tactile alphabets
 Braille
 Moon type
 New York Point
 Night writing

Manual alphabets
 Fingerspelling

For example:

 American Sign Language
 American manual alphabet
 Korean manual alphabet
 Cued Speech

Long-Distance Signaling
 International maritime signal flags
 Morse code
 Flag semaphore
 Optical telegraphy

Alternative alphabets
 Gregg Shorthand
 Initial Teaching Alphabet
 Pitman Shorthand
 Quikscript

Fictional writing systems
 Ath (alphabet)
 Aurebesh
 D'ni
 Hymmnos
 Klingon
 On Beyond Zebra!
 Scripts from The Lord of the Rings
 Cirth
 Sarati
 Tengwar
 Unown
 Utopian

For animal use
 Yerkish uses "lexigrams" to communicate with non-human primates.

See also
Constructed script (artificial script)
Grapheme
List of creators of writing systems
List of ISO 15924 codes
List of languages by first written accounts
List of languages by writing system
Unicode
Writing systems without word boundaries

Notes

References

External links
 Omniglot: a guide to writing systems
 Ancient Scripts: Home:(Site with some introduction to different writing systems and group them into origins/types/families/regions/timeline/A to Z)
 Michael Everson's Alphabets of Europe
 The World’s Writing Systems, catalogue of 294 writing systems, each with a typographic reference glyph and Unicode status
 Deseret Alphabet
 ScriptSource – a dynamic, collaborative reference to the writing systems of the world

Writing systems
Encodings